Olivier Kahn (13 September 1942 – 8 December 1999) was a French chemist. He was the brother of the geneticist Axel Kahn and the journalist Jean-François Kahn.

Kahn studied at Chimie ParisTech in Paris and received his PhD for work on metal-organic compounds with Michaël Bigorgne in 1969. After a postdoctoral position at the University of East Anglia with Sydney Kettle he became professor at the University of Paris-Sud in 1976. He stayed there until he changed position and became professor at the University of Bordeaux in 1995. He held that position until his death in 1999.

References

1942 births
1999 deaths
20th-century French chemists
French people of German-Jewish descent
Members of the French Academy of Sciences
Scientists from Paris
Chimie ParisTech alumni